The Co-operative University in Thanlyin is a public university in the Thanlyin township of Yangon Division, Myanmar.

The university offers a Bachelor of Business Science (B.B.Sc.) with five specializations, postgraduate diplomas (PGDip) and master's programmes. The university accepts 300 students annually for their four-year degree programmes.

Thanlyin Co-operative University Students' Union claims student right and university's master plan to expand the main road and to build the student hostel.

Affiliations 
The university is a part of the Southeast Asian Social Innovative Network (SEASIN), a European Commission funded project that works to promote social innovation in consortium with 15 partners, including University of Alicante, Glasgow Caledonian University, University of Aveiro, Thammasat University, Ashoka Thailand, Mith Samlanh, and Social Innovation Exchange, amongst others.

History 
On May 19, 1994, the government of Myanmar established the Yangon Co-operative Regional College with Notification Number 10/94. The college opened its doors on June 21, 1994. The college was renamed Yangon Co-operative Degree College on June 32, 1996. During the academic year of 2012–2013, it was upgraded to a Co-operative University (Thanlyin).

Academic departments 
Department of Economics
Department of Commerce
Department of Statistics
Department of Management Studies
Department of Co-operative Studies
Department of ICT
Department of Burmese
Department of English
Department of Mathematics
Department of Law
Department of Economic Geography

Degrees and diplomas 
The university offers a bachelor's programme for Business Science (B.B.Sc.) with five specialisations:

B.B.Sc. (Accounting & Finance)
B.B.Sc. (Applied Statistics)
B.B.Sc. (Marketing Management)
B.B.Sc. (Regional Development)
B.B.Sc. (Social Enterprise Management)

The university also offers postgraduate diploma courses in these specialisations. Additionally, the following master's programmes are offered by the university:
Master of Accounting and Finance
Master of Applied Statistics
Master of Marketing Management
Master of Regional Development
Master of Social Enterprise Management

References

External links 
 

Universities and colleges in Thanlyin